Pirulintia angelinae is a species of beetle in the family Cerambycidae, and the only species in the genus Pirulintia. It was described by Simonetta and Teocchi in 1995.

References

Morimopsini
Beetles described in 1995